Yunnan Normal University (YNNU) is in Kunming, the capital city of Yunnan province.

Yunnan Normal University (YNNU) is a key university of Yunnan province, with a long history and a great tradition.

It is a higher institution co-funded by the ministry of education and the provincial government of Yunnan. It is one of the 100 universities funded by the national key project for the quality enhancement of the higher institutions in central and west China.

History
Established in 1938 as the Normal College of the National Southwestern Associated University based on Beijing University, Tsinghua University, and Nankai University, it was named 'National Kunming Normal College' in 1946 when the faculties returned to the north.

After the war broke out in 1937, Peking University, Tsinghua University and Nankai University moved to Kunming and merged into the National Southwest Associated University, which consisted of the Schools of Humanities, Science, Engineering, Business and Law, and the Teachers College. Following the end of the war, the three component universities moved back to their original sites in the north, but the Teachers College, renamed National Kunming Teachers College, stayed behind to become an independent institution. In 1950, the word “National” was dropped from its name. A few decades later, in 1984, it acquired its present name, Yunnan Normal University.

In the past 75 years, YNNU has graduated more than 200,000 students for the country and is thus known as the “Cradle of Teachers on the Red-soil Plateau”.

Facilities
YNNU covers an area of 3,330 mu (about 543 acres). It consists of 26 schools and more than 40 research centers and institutes. It has over 30,000 full-time students pursuing degrees and more than 18,000 students of continuing education.

As the Provincial Center of the Data Resources of Chinese Higher Education, YNNU's library houses more than 3.2 million books with a new-generation digitized service system. The Journal of Yunnan Normal University (Social Science Edition), included in the highly selective CSSCI (Chinese Social Sciences Citation Index) list, ranks among the top 30 of its kind. The Natural Science Edition is a nationally acclaimed core journal, its impact factor ranking among the top 40 natural science journals in China. In addition, the Teaching and Research on Chinese as a Foreign Language Edition, the pioneer in this field, ranks among the top 30 journals of its kind in China in impact factor.

YNNU offers 10 disciplines: literature, history, philosophy, law, education, management, science, engineering, economics, and arts, which are well coordinated in their development. In a recent assessment conducted by the Ministry of Education, 20 of YNNU's sub-disciplines are ranked among the top 20 in the country while three of them are among the top 10. YNNU offers 86 bachelor's programs, one postdoctoral research program, one doctoral program in a first-class discipline, seven doctoral programs in second-class disciplines, 26 master's programs in first-class disciplines, 130 master's programs in second-class disciplines, and 10 professional master's programs, such as MBA and M.Ed. It is one of the first 24 universities in China that offer the Master's Program for Teaching Chinese to Speakers of Other Languages.

Through innovations and reforms in content, teaching methodology, curricula, and talent training models, YNNU has accomplished the transformation from a traditional teacher-training university to a teaching-research modern university, with teacher education as its typical trait. It has a number of state-level teaching teams, innovative training programs, special majors, brilliant teachers, excellent courses and experimental teaching bases that rank among the best in China in their respective fields. It has won national excellent teaching awards. It is carrying out state-funded projects in such areas as reforms in education system, bilingual teaching and teaching innovation and faculty development. It has 60 state-level Quality Projects under construction.

It is one of the three universities of its kind in China that offer free teacher-training programs and one of the national college-student innovation training bases. YNNU's Teaching Affairs Department, the Enrollment & Employment Department, and the Adult Education Department have won state-level honors for their respective contribution. Its undergraduate teaching is rated “Excellence” in the teaching-quality assessment conducted by the Ministry of Education.

Research
The university has many research centers or institutes at the national, ministerial or provincial levels, including the National Solar-heater Quality Testing Center, the Sino-British Solar-energy Research and Development Center, the Sino-Laos Joint Lab for Recyclable Energy Resources, the Ministry of Education's Key Lab, Engineering Research Center, Innovative Team, Technological Application and Innovation Demonstration Base, State-level Professional Talent Continuing Education Base, Research Center of Sports Culture Sponsored by the General Administration of Sport of China, Yunnan Province's Academician Work Center—Academician Gehan Amaratunga's Work Center, Research Center for the Opening of Southwest China and Frontier Security, Research Institute of Sino-Tibetan Languages, Institute of Studies of Yunnan, Yunnan College of Chinese Language and Culture, Platt American Studies Center, Ronning Canadian Studies Center, Kunming Strategy Research Institute for Pan-Asian Talent Training and Development, and so on.

In the past five years, YNNU has taken on over 100 prestigious key research projects like the National Social Science Foundation Major Project, the National Natural Science Foundation Major Project, “973” Project, “863” Project, and research projects funded by the Ministry of Science and Technology. YNNU's research funds total over 520 million yuan (RMB).

Faculties
YNNU has a staff of over 2,200 people. Many of the faculty are experts with honors awarded by the Central Government, the State Council, the Chinese Academy of Sciences, the Ministry of Education or Yunnan Provincial Government. In addition, it has invited about 100 well-known experts from 40 countries and regions all over the world as its Honorary Professors, Guest Professors or Adjunct Professors, including Professor Chen-Ning Franklin Yang, a Nobel Prize winner; Professor Yang Le; Professor Guo Bailing and Professor Dai Ruwei who are academicians of the Chinese Academy of Sciences; Professor Gehan Amaratunga from Cambridge University, an academician of the Royal Academy of Engineering, U.K.; Professor Seymour Topping, former Administrator of the Pulitzer Prizes, managing editor for the New York Times and president of the American Society of Newspaper Editors; and Dr. John Naisbitt, a well-known futurist.

International outreach
YNNU boasts of its international vision and modern ideas.

It is one of the 10 universities selected by the Ministry of Education and the Office of Chinese Language Council to support Chinese Teaching in neighboring countries. It has a Chinese Teaching Base sponsored by the Overseas Chinese Affairs Office of the State Council, a Teacher-training Base for International Promotion of TCF sponsored by Hanban/Confucius Institute Headquarters, a HSK test center, a CFL test center, and a Training and Research Center for Overseas Studies sponsored by the Ministry of Education. It has a TCFL Teacher-training Base for Southeast Asian countries.

It is one of the first Chinese universities selected by the government to establish Confucius Institutes abroad and provide government and Confucius Institute Scholarships to international students. Up to now, it has established one Confucius Institute, three Confucius Classrooms and five Chinese culture centers abroad. It has cooperation with 150 universities and research institutes in Great Britain, USA, Canada, Australia, New Zealand, Hong Kong, Macau, and Taiwan.

It has trained 13,000 international students from 62 countries. It has a training base for middle-school English teachers in southwest China sponsored by UNESCO and is one of the two universities in Yunnan Province that are authorized to enroll students from Hong Kong, Macau, and Taiwan. YNNU now has 1,705 international students from all over the world, the largest number of the higher institutions of Yunnan.

Awards
YNNU has won honors for its contribution to national unity, education development, cultural construction, moral education and legal construction from the State Council, the Ministry of Human Resources and Social Security, the Ministry of Education and the Publicity Department of the CPC Central Committee and from the provincial government and the local governments. Many of its students have won honors from governments and institutions for their scientific and technological innovation, achievements in moral education, and praiseworthy actions for helping other people and other prestigious awards. Some students are medal winners in the Olympic Games or the Paralympic Games in Beijing, Athens, or London.

In the new stage of development, YNNU will do its best to implement its strategy of “integrating our strengths with typical and local features” and develop a campus culture of “inclusiveness, harmony and politeness,” to become one of the best teaching-research normal universities in China and a high-quality university in Central and West China.

Programs for international students

Part I: Chinese Language and Culture Programs

The Institute of Chinese and International Studies offers Chinese language and culture teaching programs as follows for international students and are available all the year round:

 Non-degree Chinese language program: According to the placement test results, non-degree students are divided into beginner, pre-elementary, elementary, pre-intermediate, intermediate, pre-advanced and advanced classes. There are at most 15 students in one class. Every week, the students have 18-hour class of four courses including Comprehensive Chinese, Chinese Speaking, Listening and Reading. Besides that, every student can choose two elective courses for free, such as Chinese culture, folk dance, calligraphy, Chinese painting, tea art, Taiji, HSK training and so on. 
Bachelor's degree program for international students: The program is specially designed for international students only based on their different characteristics in language acquisition. Beginners take four years to complete the study and those who have studied Chinese for some time are allowed to shorten their study period accordingly. Undergraduate certificate and B.A. in Chinese Language and Literature can be awarded to international students when they complete their study.
International Students-Chinese students mixed program: International students directly matriculate into Chinese students’ classes and study the same courses. The studying period is usually four years and undergraduate certificate and B.A. in Chinese Language and Literature can be awarded to international students when they complete their study.

Curriculum: For non-degree program students, usually comprehensive Chinese, listening comprehension, oral Chinese, Chinese character writing, newspaper and magazine reading, Chinese culture and other courses are arranged; for bachelor's degree programs, about 30 courses on Chinese language, Chinese literature, Chinese culture and Survey of China are offered.

Part II: Bachelor’s degree programs: four years of study

Chinese Language and Literature, Clerical Studies, Mass Communication, Moral Education, Public Project Management, Pre-school Education, Applied Psychology, Ideology Education, Marketing Education, Advertisement, History, Administration Management, Geographical Science, Tourism Administration and Service, Geographic Information Systems, Mathematics and Applied Mathematics, Physics, Electronic Information Science and Technology, Applied Physics, Computer Science and Technology, Education Technology, Chemistry, Applied Chemistry, Biology, Applied Biology, English, Sports, Sports Training, Musicology, Artistic Design, Arts, Financial Administration, Applied Electronic Technology, The Science of Law, Social Sports, Biological Technology, Business Administration, Accounting, E-business, International Trade and Investment, Finance, Humanistic Education

Part III: Master’s degree programs: three years of study

School of Physics and Electronic Information（物理与电子信息）

Research Program at Yunnan Normal University

Master of Optical Engineering （光学工程硕士）

Focus: Theories on Light waves and electromagnetic waves and their
application
Focus: Color science and engineering
Focus: Light-heat refrigeration engineering

1: Department of Philosophy

Focus: Marxist Philosophy, Chinese Philosophy, Foreign Philosophy, Logistics, Ethics, Aesthetics, Religion, Philosophy of Science and Technology

2 Department of Theoretical

Focus:Economics Political Economics

3 Department of  Applied Economics

Focus:Regional Economics, Finance (Insurance)

4 Department of  Marxist Theory

Focus:Basic Principle of Marxism, Ideological Education

5 Department of  Politics 

Focus:Scientific Socialism and the International Communist Movement

6 Department of  Sociology

Focus:Sociology

7 Department of  Education

Focus:Basic Principles of Education, Curriculum and Teaching Methodology, Pre-school Education, College Education, Educational Technology, Comparative Education, Adult Education

8 Department of  Psychology

Focus:Basic Psychology, Developmental and Educational Psychology, 
Applied Psychology

9 Department of  Sports Training 

Focus:Principles and Methodology of Sports Education, Sports Humanity Socialism, Sports Body Science, Traditional Minority Sports

10 School of  Chinese Language and Literature

Focus:Chinese Linguistics and Philology, Linguistics and Applied Linguistics, Chinese Contemporary Literature, Historical Literature Theory, Chinese Ancient Literature, Chinese Minority Group's Language and Literature

11 School of  Foreign Language and Literature

Focus: English Language and Literature, Foreign Linguistics and Applied Linguistics

12 Department of  Arts

Focus:Artistic Study, Arts of Mass Communication

13 Department of  Journalism

Focus:Study of the Press

14 Department of  History

Focus:Ancient Chinese History, World History, Contemporary Chinese History

15 Department of  Mathematics

Focus:Basic Mathematics, Applied Mathematics, Probability Theory and Statistics

17 Department of Chemistry

Focus:Physical Chemistry (Chemical Physics), Inorganic Chemistry, Organic Chemistry, Chemical Analysis, Polymer Chemistry and Physics

18 Department of Biology

Focus:Botany, Genetics, Biochemistry and Molecular Biology

19 Department of Astronomy

Focus:Astrophysics

20 Department of Geography

Focus:Human Geography, Natural Geography, Geographical Information Systems

21 Department of Science and Technology of Surveying and Mapping

Focus:Study of Mapping and Geographical Information Project

23 Department of Computer Science and Technology

Focus:Computer Software and Theory

24 Department of Chemical Project and Technology

Focus:Applied Chemistry

25 Department of Agriculture Project

Focus:Agricultural Biological Environment and Energy Resources Project

26 Department of Environmental Science and Project

Focus:Environmental Science

27 Department of Business Administration

Focus:Tourism Administration

28 Department of Public Management

Focus:Administrative Management

References 
 https://web.archive.org/web/20111004080606/http://www.chinakunming.travel/show.aspx?aid=4495

External links 
 Yunnan Normal University 

Universities and colleges in Kunming
Teachers colleges in China
Educational institutions established in 1938
1938 establishments in China